Les princesses combinées ("the combined princesses") was a group of French aristocrats during the reign of Louis XVI of France.
Some authors named two, three or four members of the coterie.
They were:
 Adelaïde-Felicité-Henriette Guinot de Mauconseil, princess of Hénin (1750-1820?)
 Anne Louise Marie de Beauvau, princess of Poix
 Marie Amélie de Boufflers, duchess of Lauzun (1766) then duchess of Biron (1788). (?-1794)
 Louise Henriette Gabrielle de Lorraine, princess of Bouillon (1718-1788)
 Diane Adelaide de Damas d'Antigny, countess of Simiane. 

They were close friends since childhood.
They followed Rousseau, Voltaire and the Encyclopedistes, supported each other and were discreet in their love affairs, contrasting with other ladies of the court.
Their social circle included the De Lameth brothers, the duke of Guines and Henriette-Lucy, Marquise de La Tour du Pin Gouvernet.

References
 Dancing to the Precipice: Lucie de la Tour du Pin and the French Revolution, Caroline Moorehead, pages 99-100
 Journal d'une Femme de Cinquante Ans, Henriette Lucie Dillon, Marquise de La Tour du Pin Gouvernet
 Récits d'une tante: Mémoires de la Comtesse de Boigne, née d'Osmond (Volume 3 de 4), chapter II, Louise-Eléonore-Charlotte-Adélaide d'Osmond, comtesse de Boigne III, Émile-Pauls Fréres, Éditeurs, Paris, 1922.

18th-century French people
French nobility
Friendship